The Bridge to Breakwater is a footrace, bicycle race, and skateboard race held along the Los Angeles Harbor in San Pedro, California, that featured 12k and 5k distances. The first time this race came together was on Labor Day Weekend in 2006. In 2007 the race was promoted but had to be staged informally. The race was not formally held in 2008, however is walked, run and skateboarded informally every year by many local people.

Foot races in California